Karl Stefanovic (born 12 August 1974), also spelt Karl Stefanović, is an Australian television presenter and journalist for the Nine Network.  

Stefanovic is currently a co-host of the Nine Network's breakfast program Today and presents for 60 Minutes.

Career

Early life
Stefanovic studied journalism at university, but after earning his degree could not secure a cadetship. At his father's suggestion, he auditioned for NIDA, but did not make the final cut despite making it through a few rounds of auditions. Although he was encouraged to re-apply for the following year, he took up a job offer from WIN Television in Rockhampton instead.

In 1994, he began working for WIN in Rockhampton and Cairns as a cadet reporter.

In 1996, Stefanovic took up a position with TVNZ as a reporter for One Network News in New Zealand. In 1998, Stefanovic returned to Australia with a job reporting and presenting for Ten News in Brisbane, and also acted as a fill-in news presenter for Ron Wilson in Sydney.

Nine Network
In 2000, Stefanovic moved to the Nine Network as a reporter and back-up presenter for Nine News in Brisbane. He received a Queensland Media Award for Best News Coverage for his report on the Childers backpacker hostel fire in 2000. His reports on the 2001 Warragamba bushfires from Sussex Inlet in January 2002 led to his appointment to Nine's Sydney newsroom, and he was involved in the coverage of the 2003 Canberra bushfires.

In February 2005, Stefanovic replaced Today host Steve Liebmann. He has been a fill-in host on A Current Affair for Tracy Grimshaw. In 2006, he participated in the Nine Network reality television show Torvill and Dean's Dancing on Ice. He eventually made it to the grand final of the show, but was beaten by Jake Wall by a viewer poll. In 2008, Stefanovic took over as host of Nine Network's Carols by Candlelight with Lisa Wilkinson replacing longtime host Ray Martin. He continued to host Carols by Candlelight until 2012, when he was replaced by David Campbell.

In 2011, along with his hosting role at Today, Stefanovic was a contributing reporter on 60 Minutes. He also  hosted a Sunday evening edition of A Current Affair (ACA Sunday). 

In December 2011, he was a crew member aboard racing supermaxi yacht Investec LOYAL when it won line honours in the 2011 Sydney to Hobart Yacht Race. Stefanovic hosted the Nine Network's evening reports on the 2012 London Olympics. In December 2013, he was a crew member aboard supermaxi yacht Perpetual Loyal in the 2013 Sydney to Hobart Yacht Race, with his other celebrity crew members, Larry Emdur, Guillaume Brahimi, Tom Slingsby, Phil Waugh and Jude Bolton.

In October 2015, Stefanovic hosted television the panel show The Verdict on the Nine Network. The weekly show mixed elements of successful programs The Project and Q&A but courted controversy with its line-up of panelists.

In July 2017, Stefanvoic began hosting This Time Next Year on the Nine Network.

In December 2018, it was announced that Stefanovic would not be returning as a co-host of Today in 2019. 

In November 2019, the Nine Network announced that Stefanovic would be returning to Today as co-host from January 2020 alongside Weekend Today co-host and 60 Minutes reporter Allison Langdon.

In June 2020, Stefanovic celebrated 20 years with the Nine Network.

2GB 
In June 2019, it was announced that Stefanovic would become a regular contributor on 2GB.

Personal life
Stefanovic was born in Darlinghurst, New South Wales, to a Serbian-German father and an Australian mother. His younger brother, Peter Stefanovic, is a correspondent with 60 Minutes.

He was educated at St Augustines College (Cairns), the Anglican Church Grammar School and the Queensland University of Technology, where he graduated with a degree in journalism in 1994.

Stefanovic met journalist Cassandra Thorburn at a party in Rockhampton in 1995 and later married; they have three children together. In September 2016, it was revealed that Stefanovic had separated from his wife after 21 years; their divorce was finalised in October 2017.

In February 2018, Stefanovic made public his engagement to Jasmine Yarbrough. He married Yarbrough in December 2018 at a ceremony in Mexico. They have one child together.

Controversy
In July 2016, Stefanovic attracted criticism from the LGBT community after using the word "tranny" and making a number of jokes deemed transphobic during a segment on Today. On 29 July 2016, a day after the segment, he made a public apology on the show, stating that "I was an ignorant tool" and stated that he was informed of how offensive the term was considered. He was later nominated for an ACON LGBTI award for his honest apology, and has gone on to be an outspoken advocate of the queer community. In 2017, Stefanovic spoke out against the conservative government putting obstacles in the way of passing same-sex marriage legislation, condemning the government for turning the issue into a “political football”. He also debated prominent Anglican minister Michael Jensen on the topic during a live interview, arguing for a ‘yes’ vote on the then-upcoming marriage equality plebiscite.

Stefanovic was involved in a public fight with former Australian Test Captain Michael Clarke (cricketer), which also involved their partners. In the video, Stefanovic's sister-in-law Jade Yarbrough, accuses Michael Clarke of being unfaithful and cheating on her, prompting Clarke to lash out at Stefanovic.

Television shows and film appearances

Awards
At the 2011 Logie Awards, Stefanovic won two awards - the Gold Logie for Most Popular Personality, and the Silver Logie for Most Popular Presenter.

Suit incident
On 15 November 2014, Stefanovic revealed in an interview with Fairfax Media that he had been wearing the same suit on-air every day for a year, "except for a couple of times because of circumstance", as what he said was an experiment in sexism. He said that, while his female colleagues receive regular criticism for whatever they wear, nobody noticed his outfit the whole time. He did, however, vary his ties and shirts more regularly than his suit.

References

External links

 Karl Stefanovic profile at TODAY
 Karl Stefanovic Twitter
 

Australian television presenters
Living people
1974 births
Queensland University of Technology alumni
Australian people of German descent
Australian people of Serbian descent
People educated at Anglican Church Grammar School
Australian expatriates in New Zealand
Gold Logie winners
People from Redland City